Petrovsky Park is a station on the Bolshaya Koltsevaya line of the Moscow Metro. It served the eastern terminus of the line until 30 December 2018, when the extension of Bolshaya Koltsevaya to Savyolovskaya opened. It opened on 26 February 2018 as one of five initial stations on the new line. Petrovsky Park allows transfers to Dinamo Station on the Zamoskvoretskaya line since 29 December 2020.

Location
It is in the Aeroport District of Moscow near Petrovsky Park and Petrovsky Palace in northern Moscow. It is adjacent to VTB Arena, which is the home stadium of FC Dynamo Moscow. The station is named for Petrovsky Park.

Design and Layout
There are entrances on both sides of Leningradsky Prospekt. The interior of the station includes images of the 18th century palace as well as silouettes of trees to invoke images of the park. The flared columns are made of marble, while the floors consists of granite tiles.

References

Moscow Metro stations
Bolshaya Koltsevaya line
Railway stations in Russia opened in 2018
Railway stations located underground in Russia